Monochamus masaoi is a species of beetle in the family Cerambycidae. It was described by Kusama and Takakuwa in 1984. It is known from Japan.

References

masaoi
Beetles described in 1984